Operation Juno was a German sortie to the North Sea during the Norwegian Campaign. The most notable engagement of the operation was German battleships  and  sinking the British aircraft carrier  and its two escorting destroyers. Several Allied vessels were sunk in other engagements.

Operation

The operation began on 8 June 1940, as an attack on Harstad to relieve pressure on the German garrison at Narvik. After refuelling at Jan Mayen Island  the operation became redundant as the Allies were evacuating from Norway. The German commander, Admiral Wilhelm Marschall, took the initiative to seek and destroy the Allied transports. The troop transport Orama, the tanker Oil Pioneer and the mine-sweepeing trawler  were sunk. Marschall ordered the Admiral Hipper and the destroyers to Trondheim, where they arrived in the morning of 9 June. The next day, Admiral Hipper attempted to leave Trondheim but was prevented by the sighting of a British submarine.

Sinking of HMS Glorious

On the night of 7/8 June, Glorious, took on board ten 263 Squadron Gloster Gladiators and eight Hawker Hurricanes of 46 Squadron Royal Air Force, the first landing of modern aircraft without arrestor hooks on a carrier. These had flown from land bases to keep them from being destroyed in the evacuation. Glorious was part of a troop convoy headed for Scapa Flow, also including the carrier .

In the early hours of 8 June, Glorious requested permission to proceed independently at a faster speed. According to Alan Beith, this was because D'Oyly-Hughes was impatient to hold a court-martial of his Commander, Flying, J. B. Heath and Lieutenant Commander Evelyn Slessor. Heath had refused an order to attack certain shore targets on the grounds that his aircraft were unsuited to the task and had been left behind in Scapa to await trial. It has been noted by Beith that Glorious was in a low state of readiness. The high crow's nest look-out position was not manned, leaving the observation task to the destroyers with much lower observation angles.

D'Oyly-Hughes failed to launch aircraft for a Combat Air Patrol around the carrier group, reportedly to give the aircrews a rest. The previous commander always had some aircraft in the air. Had he done so, Glorious might have been able to spot incoming threats or have been able to either turn and run or fight. No aircraft were even on the deck for a quick launch. In her hangars were ten Hurricanes and ten Gladiators from the RAF, her nine Sea Gladiators and five Swordfish.

While sailing through the Norwegian Sea, the carrier and Acasta and Ardent were intercepted by the German battleships Scharnhorst and Gneisenau. The survivor from Acasta was rescued by the Norwegian steam merchant ship Borgund which also saved 38 men from one of Glorious''' lifeboats. All 39 men saved by Borgund were set ashore at Tórshavn in the Faroe Islands on 14 June.Scharnhorsts salvoes hit Glorious at 16:32, before the latter's torpedo-bombers could be launched. A salvo from Gneisenau  subsequently hit the bridge. The destroyers had started to lay smoke to protect Glorious and themselves. Ardent and Acasta made continual attempts to launch torpedoes at the German ships. At about 17:39, Scharnhorst was hit by one of four torpedoes launched by Acasta. Fifty sailors were killed,  of water flooded into her and her aft turret was put out of action.Ardent was sunk at around 17:20 having made seven attacks with torpedoes. Marschall, aboard Gneisenau, ordered Scharnhorst to cease fire and wasting ammunition on Glorious. At this point, Gneisenau was  closer to Glorious than Scharnhorst.

AftermathScharnhorst and Gneisenau made for Trondheim for repairs. Due to their exposed position they were not able to stop to rescue survivors of any of the ships. On 13 June, 15 Fleet Air Arm Blackburn Skua bombers from Ark Royal attacked Scharnhorst in harbour. One bomb struck her for the loss of eight Skuas. The Skua was withdrawn from operations in 1941 and retired in 1945.Willis and Partridge 2007, p. 26. As a result of the action, 1,519 men on board Glorious, Acasta and Ardent were killed, exceeding any of the other great British naval disasters of the war, along the three warships, two RAF fighter squadrons were lost. Damage from the torpedo attacks forced Scharnhorst to return to Trondheim for emergency repairs, reaching Kiel on 23 June to go into dry dock. She remained there under repair for most of the rest of 1940. Although Glorious'' was a great loss, the withdrawal of these two powerful German warships allowed the remaining Allied convoys to reach Britain with a greatly reduced threat.

See also 
 List of Kriegsmarine ships
 List of classes of British ships of World War II

References

Further reading

External links
 Destruction of the glorious on scharnhorst-class.dk
 The Tragedy of H.M.S. Glorious, H.M.S. Ardent and H.M.S. Acasta

Norwegian campaign
Battles of World War II involving Germany
Battle of the Atlantic
Naval battles of World War II involving Germany
Naval battles of World War II involving Norway
Naval battles and operations of World War II involving the United Kingdom
Naval battles and operations of the European theatre of World War II
June 1940 events